Šejla is a female first name, mostly used in Bosnia and Herzegovina.

Notable people 

 Šejla Kamerić (born 1976), Bosnian visual artist
 Šejla Merdanović (born 1997), Bosnian alpine ski racer
 Šejla Selimović (born 1995), Bosnian footballer

Feminine given names
Bosnian feminine given names